Alamosa Creek, also known as Alamosa Arroyo and Alamosa River, is a tributary stream of the Rio Grande in Socorro and Sierra County, New Mexico. Its mouth was originally at its confluence with the Rio Grande, before that river was flooded by the Elephant Butte Reservoir created by the Elephant Butte Dam. Its mouth is now on the western edge of that reservoir at the mouth of Monticello Canyon.

References 

Rivers of Socorro County, New Mexico
Rivers of Sierra County, New Mexico
Rivers of New Mexico